Harmony Township is one of the sixteen townships of Morrow County, Ohio, United States.  The 2010 census found 2,626 people in the township.

Geography
Located in the central part of the county, it borders the following townships:
Franklin Township - northeast
Chester Township - east
South Bloomfield Township - southeast corner
Bennington Township - south
Lincoln Township - west
Gilead Township - northwest

No municipalities are located in Harmony Township.

Name and history
Harmony Township was organized in 1820. Statewide, the only other Harmony Township is located in Clark County.

Government
The township is governed by a three-member board of trustees, who are elected in November of odd-numbered years to a four-year term beginning on the following January 1. Two are elected in the year after the presidential election and one is elected in the year before it. There is also an elected township fiscal officer, who serves a four-year term beginning on April 1 of the year after the election, which is held in November of the year before the presidential election. Vacancies in the fiscal officership or on the board of trustees are filled by the remaining trustees.

References

External links
County website

Townships in Morrow County, Ohio
1820 establishments in Ohio
Populated places established in 1820
Townships in Ohio